S. Kumar is an Indian cinematographer, who works in Malayalam, Tamil, Telugu, and Hindi film industry. His first independent work was with the film, Thiranottam in 1978. He is a founding member of the Indian Society of Cinematographers (ISC).

Personal life
S. Kumar is married. His son, Kunjunni S. Kumar is also a cinematographer.

Awards and nominations

 1994 – Won: National Film Award – Special Mention (Feature film) – Parinayam
 1993 – Won: Filmfare Award – Mushkurat
 2004 – Won: Kerala State Film Award for Best Cinematography – Akale
 1991 – Won: Kerala State Film Award for Best Cinematography – Kilukkam
 2003 – Won: Asianet Film Awards – Pattalam
 2005 – Won: Asianet Film Awards – Udayananu Tharam
 2007 – Won: Vanitha Film Awards – Calcutta News

Selected filmography
 Makal
 Nalpathiyonnu
 Njan Prakashan
 Jomonte Suvisheshangal
 Veeram
 Rajamma @ Yahoo
 Pullipulikalum Aattinkuttiyum
 Ezhamathe Varavu
 Indian Rupee
 Dus Tola
 Calcutta News
 Vinodayathra
 Vadakkumnadhan
 Udayananu Tharam
 Akale
 Vellithira
 Meesha Madhavan
 One 2 Ka 4
 Grahan
 Randam Bhavam
 Kakkakuyil
 Mazha
 Chandranudikkunna Dikhil
 Chinthavishtayaya Shyamala
 Yuvathurki
 Mazhayethum Munpe
 Gandheevam
 Guru
 Parinayam
 Paithrukam
 Midhunam
 Adwaitham
 Aavarampoo
 Johny Walker
 Muskurahat
 Kilukkam
 Dhanam
 Nirnayam
 Akkare Akkare Akkare
 Kadathanadan Ambadi
 Vandanam
 Aryan
 Chithram
 Nombarathippoovu
 Boeing Boeing
 Parayanum Vayya Parayathirikkanum Vayya
 Onnanam Kunnil Oradi Kunnil
 Punnaram Cholli Cholli
 Odaruthammava Aalariyam
 Poochakkoru Mookkuthi
 Thenum Vayambum
 Thiranottam

References

External links

Living people
Tamil film cinematographers
Malayalam film cinematographers
Filmfare Awards winners
Kerala State Film Award winners
Artists from Thiruvananthapuram
20th-century Indian photographers
21st-century Indian photographers
Cinematographers from Kerala
Year of birth missing (living people)